Pernella Mae Center Anderson  (1903–1980) was an African American interviewer for the Federal Writers' Project. She was from El Dorado, Arkansas. She was the only African American woman in Arkansas to interview former slaves. She went on to teach in Detroit.

References 

People of the New Deal arts projects
African-American schoolteachers
Schoolteachers from Arkansas
20th-century American women educators
People from El Dorado, Arkansas
1903 births
1980 deaths
20th-century American educators
20th-century African-American women
20th-century African-American politicians
20th-century American politicians